Microtritia stria is a species of mite.

Distribution
The species is found in New Zealand.

References

Acari of New Zealand
Animals described in 2014
Terrestrial biota of New Zealand